Thorsten Nehrbauer (born 12 January 1978 in Bonn) is a German former football player. He later became a manager.

References

External links
 

1978 births
Living people
Sportspeople from Bonn
German footballers
Footballers from North Rhine-Westphalia
Association football midfielders
Germany under-21 international footballers
Bundesliga players
2. Bundesliga players
3. Liga players
Bayer 04 Leverkusen players
Bayer 04 Leverkusen II players
Fortuna Düsseldorf players
1. FSV Mainz 05 players
Hannover 96 players
1. FC Saarbrücken players
Bonner SC players
Kickers Emden players
German football managers
1. FC Kaan-Marienborn managers
Bonner SC managers